Wilhelm Lehmann (1882–1968) was a German teacher and writer. 

Wilhelm Lehmann name may also refer to:

 Gottfried Wilhelm Lehmann (1799–1882), German engraver and congregation leader
 Jacob Heinrich Wilhelm Lehmann (1800–1863), German astronomer

See also
 William Lehman (disambiguation)
 Wilhelm Ehmann